Itterajivit (also Ittaajimmiut or Igterajivit), formerly Kap Hope, was a small village in the Sermersooq municipality in eastern Greenland. It was abandoned in late 2005. It was the last remaining populated settlement outside Ittoqqortoormiit, located on Liverpool Land, across the Rosenvinge bay to the west of the town. It was featured in the TV show Departures.

References 

Former populated places in Greenland